Marcus Marshall is a racing driver.

Marcus Marshall may also refer to:

Marcus Marshall (footballer) (born 1987), Jamaica-born English footballer
Marcus Marshall Motorsport

See also
Mark Marshall